An Autumn Without Berlin is a 2015 Spanish drama film written and directed by Lara Izagirre, starring Irene Escolar and Tamar Novas.

Escolar won the Goya Award for Best New Actress for her performance.

Cast
 Irene Escolar as June
 Tamar Novas as Diego
 Lier Quesada as Nico
 Naiara Carmona as Ane
 Ramón Barea as Aita
 Mariano Estudillo as Aitor
 Itziar Ituño as Sofía
 Patricia López Arnaiz as Presenter

Awards

References

External links
 
 

2015 films
Spanish drama films
2010s Spanish-language films
2010s Spanish films
2015 drama films